Damian M. Surma (born January 22, 1981) is an American retired professional ice hockey left winger.

Biography
Surma was born in Lincoln Park, Michigan. As a youth, he played in the 1995 Quebec International Pee-Wee Hockey Tournament with the Detroit Little Caesars minor ice hockey team.

He played junior ice hockey for the Plymouth Whalers of the Ontario Hockey League. His best season came in the 1999-00 season when he recorded 78 points in 66 games with the Plymouth Whalers. He scored 34 goals and recorded 44 assists that season while spending 114 minutes in the penalty box.

was drafted 174th overall by the Carolina Hurricanes in the 1999 NHL Entry Draft and played two games for the Hurricanes. He scored a goal in his first game and registered an assist in the second.

From 2006 to 2007, he played in Serie A league for HC Valpellice Bulldogs and Associazione Sportiva Asiago Hockey. After spells in the ECHL and the UHL, moved to Italy in 2006, signing for Asiago, he scored 9 goals and 16 assists for 25 points, ranking him third amongst the team. While playing for the HC Valpellice Bulldogs, Surma was suspended for 10 months from the Italian ice hockey federation for firing a puck at a referee after the referee had handed out a penalty against him. This was the longest suspension ever handed out in Italy.

He most recently played with the Arizona Sundogs of the Central Hockey League (CHL).

Career statistics

References

External links

1981 births
American men's ice hockey left wingers
Arizona Sundogs players
Carolina Hurricanes draft picks
Carolina Hurricanes players
Dayton Gems players
Evansville IceMen players
Florida Everblades players
Asiago Hockey 1935 players
HC Valpellice players
Ice hockey players from Michigan
Kalamazoo Wings (UHL) players
Living people
Lowell Lock Monsters players
Missouri River Otters players
Muskegon Lumberjacks players
People from Lincoln Park, Michigan
Plymouth Whalers players
Rapid City Rush players
Stockton Thunder players
Wichita Thunder players